The Trefor Quarry railway was an industrial,  narrow-gauge railway connecting the Trefor granite quarry with the pier at Llanaelhaearn on the Llŷn Peninsula.

History 

The Trefor granite quarry (also known as the Yr Eifl quarry) opened in 1850. In 1855 the quarry applied to build a jetty on the coast to ship granite products. The pier was not built, but the application was renewed in 1867, the pier being built by 1870 and a railway was constructed connecting the quarry with the pier. There had been horse-worked internal quarry tramways as early as 1865.

In 1873 steam locomotives were introduced to work in the quarry and along the ½ mile long section from the foot of the quarry incline to the pier. One incline was particularly steep with one section at a gradient of 1 in 1¾, said to be the steepest incline in any granite quarry in Britain.

A short branch line served the village of Trefor at the foot of the incline. This branch was lifted before 1920. From 1951 onwards the railway was gradually replaced by road transport. The main incline was abandoned in 1959 and the railway finally closed in 1962.

Locomotives

See also
 British industrial narrow gauge railways

References 

 

1 ft 11½ in gauge railways in Wales
Industrial railways in Wales
Railway lines opened in 1850
Railway lines closed in 1962